Zethera incerta, the great Wallacean, is butterfly endemic to the island of Sulawesi in Indonesia. It was described by William Chapman Hewitson in 1869.

Subspecies
 Z. i. incerta (North Sulawesi)
 Z. i. tenggara Roos, 1992 (Southeast Sulawesi)

References

External links

Butterflies described in 1869
Elymniini
Butterflies of Indonesia
Taxa named by William Chapman Hewitson